Mediastinal lymph nodes are lymph nodes located in the mediastinum.

Pathology
Mediastinal lymphadenopathy
Mediastinal mass

References

Lymphatics of the torso